Jehan Bretel (c.1210 – 1272) was a trouvère. Of his known oeuvre of probably 97 songs, 96 have survived. Judging by his contacts with other trouvères he was famous and popular. Seven works by other trouvères (Jehan de Grieviler, Jehan Erart, Jaques le Vinier, Colart le Boutellier, and Mahieu de Gant) are dedicated to Bretel and he was for a time the "Prince" of the Puy d'Arras.

Bretel held the hereditary post of sergeant at the Abbey of Saint Vaast in Arras, in which capacity he oversaw the rights of the abbacy on the river Scarpe. He is referred to as sergens iretavles de la riviere Saint-Vaast in a document of 1256. His father, Jehan, had held this same post from 1241 (at the latest) until his death in 1244. His grandfather, Jacques, was described as sergent héréditaire around the turn of the century, when there were eight such officials associated with the abbey. The trouvère and his brother were modestly wealthy property owners near Arras, where Jehan died in 1272.

Bretel wrote eight known chansons courtoises, of which seven survive. Bretel dedicated the chanson Li miens chanters to the countess Beatrice, wife of William III of Dampierre and sister of Henry III, Duke of Brabant.

Bretel also participated in eighty-nine jeux partis, nearly half of all recorded jeux partis. Many of these are assigned on the basis of internal evidence (the poets are often named) since they lack rubrics. A few of these are addressed only to a Sire Jehan or just Sire and their ascription to Bretel, though likely, is not certain. About forty different poets from the region around Arras participated in these jeux partis, either as judges or correspondents. Generally these poems are grouped with others by Bretel in the chansonniers, even if he did not initiate them, though those he initiated with the famous trouvère Adam de la Halle are usually grouped with Adam's works.

List of works

Chansons courtoises

Jeux partis
With Adam de la Halle

, no music

, proposed by Adam, no music
, proposed by Adam
With Audefroi
, proposed by Audefroi

With Jehan le Cuvelier d'Arras
, no music

, two melodies

, no music
With Gaidifer d'Avion

With Gerart de Boulogne
, proposed by Gerart, no music
With Jehan de Grieviler

, no music

, no music

, no music

, no music

, no music

, two melodies

, proposed by Grieviler
, proposed by Grieviler
, no music

, no music

, no music
, proposed by Grieviler
, two melodies
, proposed by Grieviler, no music
, proposed by Grieviler, no music
With Jehan de Marli

With Jehan de Renti
, proposed by Jehan de Renti, no music
With Jehan Simon
, two melodies
With Jehan de Vergelai

With Lambert Ferri:

, no music

, proposed by Lambert, two melodies
, no music

, proposed by Lambert
, proposed by Lambert
, proposed by Lambert, no music
With Mahieu li Taillere

With Perrin d'Angicourt

, proposed by Perrin
With Perrot de Neele

, proposed by Perrot
, no music

With Prieus de Boulogne
, no music
With Robert de Castel

With Robin de Compiegne
, proposed by Robin, no music
With Robert de la Piere

With more than two
, proposed jointly by Bretel and Lambert Ferri to Jehan le Cuvelier d'Arras and the Tresorier d'Aire
, proposed by Bretel to Jehan le Cuvelier d'Arras, Lambert Ferri, and Jehan de Grieviler

Notes

Sources
Karp, Theodore. "Bretel, Jehan." Grove Music Online. Oxford Music Online. Accessed 12 November 2008.

Trouvères
1272 deaths
Year of birth uncertain
Male classical composers